Kreiz Breizh Elites Dames (full title Tour de Belle Isle en Terre–Kreiz Breizh Elites Dames) is a women's multiple-stage road cycling race held annually in Brittany. The first edition was held in 2018 as a 1.2 category one-day race on the UCI women's road cycling calendar and since 2019 it is held as a 2.2 category race over two days. It has the same organisers as the men's Kreiz Breizh Elites stage race.

Past winners

References

External links 
 

Cycle races in France
Women's road bicycle races
2018 establishments in France
Recurring sporting events established in 2018
Sport in Brittany